Leon McFadden (born April 26, 1944) is a former right-handed Major League Baseball shortstop and outfielder who played from  to  for the Houston Astros.

Career
Prior to playing professional baseball, McFadden attended Fremont High School in Los Angeles, California, with future professional players Brock Davis, Willie Crawford, Bobby Tolan, and Bob Watson.

In his only at-bat of the game, McFadden collected a base hit. Overall, McFadden appeared in 16 games for the Astros in 1968, collecting 13 hits in 47 at-bats for a .277 batting average. He scored twice and drove in one run.

McFadden was used as a bench player in 1969, playing in 44 games and getting only 74 at-bats. He collected only 13 hits for a .176 batting average. In 1970, he appeared in two games as a pinch runner. He appeared in his final big league game on April 28 of that year, when he ran for Watson. Two month later, he was traded with Jim Beauchamp to the St. Louis Cardinals for George Culver. However, he never played in a Cardinals uniform.

Overall, McFadden appeared in 62 big league games, collecting 26 hits in 121 at-bats for a .215 batting average. He hit three doubles, no triples and no home runs, scored five times and drove in four runs. He stole two bases, was caught twice, walked 10 times and struck out 19 times. His career fielding percentage was .962.

In 54 games with the Hanshin Tigers in 1972, McFadden batted .283, with two home runs and six RBI.

Personal life
His son, Leon McFadden, is a current American football cornerback for the Dallas Cowboys of the NFL and played his college career at San Diego State University.

External links 

Pelota Binaria (Venezuelan Winter League)

1944 births
Living people
African-American baseball players
Amarillo Sonics players
American expatriate baseball players in Japan
American expatriate baseball players in Mexico
Baseball players from Arkansas
Broncos de Reynosa players
Cardenales de Lara players
American expatriate baseball players in Venezuela
Cocoa Astros players
Durham Bulls players
Florida Instructional League Astros/Reds players
Hanshin Tigers players
Houston Astros players
Major League Baseball left fielders
Major League Baseball right fielders
Major League Baseball shortstops
Modesto Colts players
Nippon Professional Baseball first basemen
Nippon Professional Baseball third basemen
Nippon Professional Baseball outfielders
Oklahoma City 89ers players
Salisbury Astros players
Sportspeople from Little Rock, Arkansas
Tacoma Cubs players
Tulsa Oilers (baseball) players
John C. Fremont High School alumni
21st-century African-American people
20th-century African-American sportspeople